Closed Circuit is a 2013 British-American political thriller drama film directed by John Crowley and written by Steven Knight, released on August 28, 2013. The film stars Eric Bana, Rebecca Hall, Ciarán Hinds, Jim Broadbent, and Riz Ahmed.

Plot
A bomb planted in a lorry detonates in London's Borough Market killing 120 people. The London police receive an anonymous tip and arrest Farroukh Erdogan, a Turkish immigrant, as the terror cell leader and mastermind of the attack. Two other members of the cell die in the bombing and the fourth is killed by police in a shoot-out during the raid to apprehend him. When Erdogan's defence barrister commits suicide, Martin Rose is appointed by the Attorney General to replace him, joining special advocate Claudia Simmons-Howe. Due to national security concerns, Erdogan's case follows closed material procedures; Claudia represents Erdogan during closed sessions with a judge ruling what evidence is permissible for Martin to use in the open public trial. MI5 Agent Nazrul Sharma is assigned to provide Claudia with the closed material and monitor her activities.

Martin discovers that despite his extensive criminal record, Erdogan was somehow quickly approved for immigration from his previous residence in Germany to England and within six months was living well beyond his income. He finds proof that Farroukh Erdogan is really Mussi Kartal, a member of a terror cell responsible for bombing a U.S. Air Force base in Munich a few years prior. Kartal cut a deal with prosecutors to avoid prison, agreeing to work as an informant for MI5 by infiltrating the London terror cell and providing MI5 with information to make arrests. Martin suspects that after the Borough Market bombing, MI5 feared their botched operation would be publicly blamed as directly financing terrorism and sought to have Kartal take the fall and suppress any evidence of MI5 involvement. Martin and Claudia discussed the matters discreetly during the England national football team match at the Wembley Stadium.

In the first closed court session, MI5 Agent Melissa Fairbright reveals that Kartal's son Amir had hacked into his father's laptop and had provided valuable information to MI5. The judge orders Amir's testimony in court, deeming it relevant to the case. Amir, who is being monitored by MI5 agents at a safe house with his mother, manages to escape to his aunt's home. He meets with Martin and Claudia, giving them a flash drive detailing his father's involvement with the MI5 terror cell operation. Martin and Claudia realize MI5 will kill Amir to protect themselves and go on the run with him overnight, planning to have him testify in court the next day. Amir testifies in closed session, but Kartal is later murdered in prison and made to look like a suicide by hanging. With Kartal dead, the case collapses and all evidence of the MI5 operation is suppressed from public disclosure. Amir and his mother, however, are allowed to remain in England.

Three months later, as Martin and Claudia rekindle their romance that resulted in Martin's divorce from his wife, information of MI5's involvement in the Borough Market bombing is anonymously leaked to the media.

Cast

 Riz Ahmed as MI5 Agent Nazrul Sharma
 Doug Allen as Ryan
 Eric Bana as Defense Barrister Martin Rose (named Vickers in earlier versions)
 Barbora Bobuľová as Piccola
 Jim Broadbent as Attorney General of England and Wales
 Kenneth Cranham as Cameron Fischer
 Anne-Marie Duff as MI5 Agent Melissa Fairbright
 Rebecca Hall as Special Advocate Claudia Simmons-Howe
 Isaac Hempstead-Wright as Tom Rose
 Ciarán Hinds as Devlin
 John Humphrys as himself
 Denis Moschitto as Farroukh Erdogan/Mussi Kartal
 Jemma Powell as Elizabeth
 Julia Stiles as Joanna Reece
 Angus Wright as Andrew Altman
 Luing Andrews as Belmarsh Guard

Reception
On Rotten Tomatoes, the film has an approval rating of  based on reviews from  critics. The site's critical consensus states: "Slick and well acted, Closed Circuit unfortunately never quite works up a full head of steam, with a plot that's alternately predictable and full of holes." On Metacritic, the film has a score of 50 out of 100, based on 39 critics.

Peter Debruge of Variety called it a "slick, smarter-than-usual conspiracy yarn."
Stephen Farber of The Hollywood Reporter wrote: "A couple of scenes toward the end do generate the suspense that the whole movie needed. But the impact is too muted, and an air of tired familiarity ultimately curdles the entire enterprise."

See also
 List of films featuring surveillance

References

External links
 
 
 

2013 films
2013 crime drama films
2013 crime thriller films
2013 thriller drama films
2010s political thriller films
British crime thriller films
British political thriller films
British thriller drama films
2010s English-language films
Films about murder
Films about security and surveillance
Films about terrorism in Europe
Films directed by John Crowley
Films produced by Eric Fellner
Films produced by Tim Bevan
Films set in London
Films shot in London
Focus Features films
Films about mass murder
MI5 in fiction
Films with screenplays by Steven Knight
Universal Pictures films
2010s British films